Traditional Chinese wedding dress is a collective term which refers to all the different forms and styles of traditional wedding attire worn by the Han Chinese when performing their marriage ceremony, including the traditional Chinese marriage. There are various forms of traditional Chinese wedding dress in the history of China. Since the Zhou dynasty, there have national laws and rules which regulated the different categories of clothing and personal accessories; these regulations have created various categories of clothing attire, including the traditional wedding attire of the Chinese people.

Types of attire

Attire for brides

Nowadays, the  can also be worn as a wedding dress.

The  is a type of wedding set of attire categorized under . It was worn in Ming and Qing dynasties. The  attire was composed an upper and lower garment following the traditional  system.  

The  was a type of  fashioned in the style of the Ming dynasty which was red in colour; it used to be worn by the Han Chinese women as a court robe.

It is a composed of a jacket called  and a long  which could be straight in cut or have pleated sides.

Nowadays, the  has been commercialized and remains a popular form of wedding dress.

The  is typically embroidered with flowers and birds to symbolize love for whole seasons.

Accessories

Brides

See also 

 Hanfu
 Ruqun

References 

Chinese traditional clothing
Marriage in Chinese culture
Wedding dresses
Embroidery